Getting There is a 2002 direct-to-video film starring Mary-Kate and Ashley Olsen.

Plot
Taylor (Ashley Olsen) and Kylie Hunter (Mary-Kate Olsen) are celebrating their 16th birthday and are licensed to drive. They plan a trip to Salt Lake City, Utah with their friends for the 2002 Winter Olympics. When they stop at a local restaurant on the way, their car is stolen and next they board the wrong plane to San Diego. Determined to make it to Utah in time for the Olympics, the teenagers take a coach from LA to Vegas, but get separated at a gas station. Kylie and half of the gang makes it to Vegas, where they end up taking part in a Vegas wedding, whilst Taylor and the other half of the gang are stranded in a one horse town.

While trying to get ahold of her sister, Taylor meets Charly, a girl her age with a pick-up truck who offers to give her and her friends a ride to Vegas, but her truck breaks down. Charly reveals that she, who seemed like a humble farm girl, actually lives in a mansion and owns a private jet. Her dad offers to fly all of the teens to Salt Lake City.

Taylor and Kylie arrive in Utah too late for the Olympics. Taylor is upset because she would have liked to see her favourite Athlete, Alex Reisher, compete. Nonetheless, the friends decide to have fun by holding their own Olympics. Taylor meets a young man and they end up spending the day skiing together, but she never sees his face. It is not until a month later when the girls get their car back, and Taylor sees her picture in the paper, that she realizes she spent the day skiing with her Olympic crush Alex Reisher.

Cast
 Mary-Kate Olsen as Kylie Hunter
 Ashley Olsen as Taylor Hunter
 Billy Aaron Brown as Danny
 Heather Lindell as Jenn
 Jeff D'Agostino as Joshua / Toast
 Talon Ellithorpe as Sam
 Holly Towne as Lyndi
 Alexandra Picatto as Charly
 Janet Gunn as Pam Hunter
 William Bumiller as Gary Hunter
 Jason Benesh as Alexander
 Ricki Lopez as Juan
 Shelley Malil as Raj
 Marcus Smythe as Mr. Simms
 Cheyenne Wilbur as Male Proctor
 Deborah Hinderstein as Female Instructor
 James Kiriyama Lem as Male Instructor
 Chene Lawson as Ticket Clerk
 Tracy Arbuckle as Diane
 Sterling Rice as Young Female Tourst
 Jeff Thomas Johnson as Waiter in Ski Lodge

Filming Details 
The film was produced by Dualstar and Tapestry Films and distributed by Warner Bros. Getting There was filmed in Santa Barbara, California; Salt Lake City, Utah; Las Vegas, Nevada and New Mexico.

References

External links
 

2002 films
2002 comedy films
2002 direct-to-video films
2000s American films
2000s English-language films
2000s teen comedy films
American teen comedy films
Direct-to-video comedy films
Films about twin sisters
Films about the 2002 Winter Olympics
Films scored by Steve Porcaro
Warner Bros. direct-to-video films